The 1913 Tasmanian state election was held on 23 January 1913.

Retiring Members

Liberal
Thomas Bakhap MHA (Bass)

House of Assembly
Sitting members are shown in bold text. Tickets that elected at least one MHA are highlighted in the relevant colour. Successful candidates are indicated by an asterisk (*).

Bass
Six seats were up for election. The Labor Party was defending three seats. The Liberal Party was defending three seats.

Darwin
Six seats were up for election. The Labor Party was defending three seats. The Liberal Party was defending three seats.

Denison
Six seats were up for election. The Labor Party was defending four seats. The Liberal Party was defending two seats.

Franklin
Six seats were up for election. The Labor Party was defending three seats. The Liberal Party was defending three seats.

Wilmot
Six seats were up for election. The Labor Party was defending two seats. The Liberal Party was defending four seats, although Norman Cameron was running as an independent.

See also
 Members of the Tasmanian House of Assembly, 1912–1913
 Members of the Tasmanian House of Assembly, 1913–1916

References
Tasmanian Parliamentary Library

Candidates for Tasmanian state elections